The Antigonish Review is a quarterly literary magazine publishing new and established contemporary literary fiction, reviews, non-fiction articles/essays, translations, and poetry. Since 2005, the magazine runs an annual competition, the Sheldon Currie Short Fiction Contest. The winner of the inaugural Sheldon Currie Prize was Nicholas Ruddock. Since 2000, the magazine has also run a poetry competition, the Great Blue Heron Poetry Contest.

The Antigonish Review was established in 1970 with long-term editor-in-chief R. J. MacSween, who was succeeded by George Sanderson. The current editor is Thomas Hodd.

Under MacSween's and Sanderson's editorship there was staunch support of communications theorist Marshall McLuhan from his early days.

The Antigonish Review is credited with nurturing writing talent in Eastern Canada. Besides fiction, poetry, and interviews, it publishes translations, book reviews, and review essays.

References

External links 
 

1970 establishments in Nova Scotia
Literary magazines published in Canada
English-language magazines
Magazines established in 1970
Quarterly magazines published in Canada
St. Francis Xavier University
Magazines published in Nova Scotia